This is a list of foreign ministers in 1989.

Africa

Asia

Australia and Oceania

Europe

North America and the Caribbean

South America

1989 in international relations
Foreign ministers
1989